Sodium malate is a compound with formula Na2(C2H4O(COO)2). It is the sodium salt of malic acid.  As a food additive, it has the E number E350.

Properties 
Sodium malate is an odorless white crystalline powder. It is freely soluble in water.

Use 
It is used as an acidity regulator and flavoring agent. It tastes similar to sodium chloride (table salt).

References

Malates
Organic sodium salts
E-number additives